Flight 9268 may refer to:

 Red Wings Airlines Flight 9268, crashed in Moscow, Russia on 29 December 2012
 Metrojet Flight 9268, crashed in Egypt on 31 October 2015

9268